Supreme People's Court or People's Supreme Court is the highest court in the judicial system of several communist countries. It may refer to:

 Supreme People's Court of China
 Supreme People's Court of Vietnam
 People's Supreme Court of Cuba
 People's Supreme Court of Laos

See also
 People's Court (disambiguation)